Somaliland–United Arab Emirates relations refers to the relationship between the Republic of Somaliland and the United Arab Emirates. Somaliland maintains a representative (liaison) offices in the United Arab Emirates and the United Arab Emirates also maintains a representative office in Hargeisa. On 13 March 2021, Abdulla Al-Naqbi was appointed as UAE ambassador to Somaliland.

History 

In February 2017, both houses of the parliament of Somaliland accepted the bid from the government of the UAE for the United Arab Emirates Armed Forces to establish a military base in Berbera along with the redevelopment of the Berbera Airport. The United Arab Emirates has appointed a new representative to Somaliland which will be the first Arab nation to send a diplomat to Hargeisa.

See also 

 Foreign relations of Somaliland
 Foreign relations of the United Arab Emirates

References 

 
United Arab Emirates
Somaliland